The site of  in Kushiro, Hokkaidō, Japan, is that once occupied by the Ainu fortified chashi of Moshiriya. Occupying an elevated site, it is said to have been constructed during the Hōreki era (1751–1764) by the Ainu chieftain .

See also
 List of Historic Sites of Japan (Hokkaidō)
 List of Cultural Properties of Japan - archaeological materials (Hokkaidō)
 Katsuragaoka Chashi
 Yukuepira Chashi

References

External links
 Map of the Kushiro River Basin Chashi Sites 

History of Hokkaido
Kushiro, Hokkaido
Archaeological sites in Japan
Chashi